Connecticut's 15th State Senate district elects one member to the Connecticut State Senate. It encompasses parts of Waterbury, Middlebury, and Naugatuck. It has been represented by Democrat Joan Hartley since 2001.

Recent elections

2020

2018

2016

2014

2012

References

15